Sefton Council is the governing body for the Metropolitan Borough of Sefton in the county of Merseyside, north-western England. The council was under no overall control from the 1980s until 2012 when the Labour Party took control. It is a constituent council of Liverpool City Region Combined Authority.

History
Sefton Council was created by the local government reorganisation of 1974, which created a two-tier system of government in the United Kingdom.  It was a metropolitan district of the metropolitan county of Merseyside. Until 1986, the five metropolitan borough councils of Merseyside shared power with the central Merseyside County Council, but this was later abolished and its functions devolved solely to its districts.  As a result, the borough is effectively a unitary authority within the ceremonial county of Merseyside.

Sefton Council is not directly responsible for transport, waste-disposal and emergency services - these are administered by joint-boards of the five boroughs of Merseyside.

Wards
The council consists of sixty-six councillors, three for each of the borough's twenty-two wards which are as listed:

Political composition

Elections are usually by thirds, in three of every four years.

Two Sefton councillors left the Conservative Group on 13 May 2022. Ainsdale's Terry Jones and Cambridge's Sinclair D’Albuquerque formed what they are calling “The Southport Councillor Group”. The Labour Party has held a majority of the seats on the council since 2012. Ian Maher, a Labour councillor, has been leader of the council since 2015. The next election is due in May 2023.

Premises

The council meets at both Southport Town Hall and Bootle Town Hall, each of which was inherited from one of the council's predecessor authorities. Full council meetings are usually held alternately at Southport and Bootle.

References

External links
Sefton Council
Latest election results, May 2006
Southport Conservative Party
Sefton Central Conservative Party
Sefton Labour Party
Southport Liberal Democrats
Crosby Liberal Democrats

 
 
Metropolitan district councils of England
Local authorities in Merseyside
Local education authorities in England
Billing authorities in England
Leader and cabinet executives
1974 establishments in England